Adelina of Holland  ( – ) was possibly a daughter of Arnulf, Count of Holland, and Lutgardis of Luxemburg. She married firstly Baldwin II, Count of Boulogne (with whom she had Eustace I of Boulogne), and secondly Enguerrand I of Ponthieu.

990s births
1040s deaths
10th-century women of the Holy Roman Empire
Nobility of the County of Holland
Women of medieval Luxembourg
Place of birth unknown
Place of death unknown
Medieval Luxembourgian nobility
Medieval Dutch women
11th-century women of the Holy Roman Empire